Tranquility, previously known as Equanimity, is a  superyacht launched at the Oceanco yard in Alblasserdam, with Oceanco responsible for the exterior design, while Winch Design worked on the interior. The yacht was allegedly purchased by Malaysian financier Jho Low using money stolen from the Malaysian sovereign wealth fund 1MDB. It was seized by the Malaysian authorities in 2018, judicially sold to the Genting Group in early 2019, and renamed Tranquility.

Design 
The steel hull is strengthened to Ice Class E, with the superstructure made out of aluminium with teak laid decks. The yacht is built to RINA classification society rules, issued by Cayman Islands.

Equanimity is built to comply with the Passenger Yacht Code (PYC).

The ships facilities include a sauna, helicopter landing pad, swimming pool, gym, spa, movie theatre and an on deck Jacuzzi.

The tender garage houses two 10.5 metre tenders, that can carry up to 12 guests and two crew each. She is well equipped for adventure with a range of water toys including Jet Skis, Wave Runners, SeaBobs and an electric surfboard.

Engines 
Power is delivered by twin 4,828 hp/3,600 kW MTU 20V 4000 M73L diesel engines with  fuel tanks.

Seizure and judgement 
In March 2018, it was reported that Indonesian authorities seized Equanimity in February. The US Department of Justice has been working on this case in relation to the 1MDB scandal since 2016 and has named Jho Low, the alleged owner of Equanimity, as a key figure in the US lawsuit. They believe funds used for the acquisition of the yacht were transferred from the Malaysian sovereign wealth fund 1MDB between 2009 and 2015.

In late April 2018, it was reported that Equanimity was released to its owner after an Indonesian court declared that the seizure of the yacht was invalid. However, Indonesian police seized the yacht again three months later after a request for legal assistance from the United States.

In August 2018, Equanimity was brought back to Malaysia from Indonesia and seized under Malaysian law following the activation of Mutual Legal Assistance Treaties between Indonesia, the United States and Malaysia. However, in a statement through his legal team, Low accused Prime Minister Dr Mahathir Mohamad of violating the "rule of law" for seizing the yacht.

On 19 October 2018, the High Court in Kuala Lumpur declared that the Equanimity belongs to two 1MDB subsidiaries, namely, 1MDB Energy Holdings Limited and 1MDB Global Investment Limited, after its registered owner Equanimity (Cayman) Ltd failed to appear in court to claim the superyacht.

The luxury superyacht was docked at the Boustead Cruise Centre terminal in Pulau Indah, Port Klang. It reportedly cost the government RM3 million to maintain the yacht every month.

Auction 
On 29 October 2018, Malaysia started an auction of the Equanimity through the yacht brokerage firm Burgess, which was appointed by the High Court of Malaya to assist with the sale of the superyacht.

On 3 April 2019, Malaysia's Attorney-General Tommy Thomas said the Admiralty Court in Kuala Lumpur had approved the offer by Genting to purchase the vessel, Equanimity, at the price of US$126 million.

See also
 List of motor yachts by length
 List of yachts built by Oceanco
 Luxury yacht
 Oceanco

References

2013 ships
Motor yachts
Ships built in the Netherlands
Political scandals in Malaysia